Andrew Broder (April 16, 1845 – January 4, 1918) was an Ontario farmer, merchant and political figure. He represented Dundas in the Legislative Assembly of Ontario from 1875 to 1886 and in the House of Commons of Canada from 1896 to 1911 as a Conservative member.

He was born in Franklin, Huntingdon County, Canada East in 1845, the son of Irish immigrants. He was educated at academies in Huntingdon and Malone, New York. Broder served in the militia during the time of the Fenian raids. He settled at West Winchester, Ontario in 1868 and set up in business there as a merchant. His election in 1875 was appealed but he was reelected in the by-election that followed and represented Dundas in the provincial assembly for eleven years. Broder was a customs agent at Morrisburg from 1892 to 1896, resigning this post to run for a seat in the House of Commons. He married Caroline Summers and his son Fred later became customs collector at Morrisburg.

He was the maternal uncle of Aaron Sweet, who also served as MPP for Dundas.

External links 

The Canadian parliamentary companion, 1897 JA Gemmill
Stormont, Dundas and Glengarry : a history, 1784-1945, JG Harkness (1946)

1845 births
1918 deaths
Conservative Party of Canada (1867–1942) MPs
Members of the House of Commons of Canada from Ontario
People of the Fenian raids
Progressive Conservative Party of Ontario MPPs